William Allen "Frank" Hudson (June 2, 1918 – September 27, 1943) was an American Negro league outfielder, first baseman and pitcher who played between 1937 and 1942.

Career
A native of Devereux, Georgia, Hudson began his career playing sandlot ball in Cincinnati. He joined the Cincinnati Tigers in 1937 and spent 1938 with the Cincinnati White Sox.

Hudson joined the Kansas City Monarchs of the Negro American League in 1939. He went on to play three seasons with the Chicago American Giants from 1940 to 1942, and was selected to play in the East–West All-Star Game in 1941. That season, Chicago manager Candy Jim Taylor regarded Hudson as the best left-handed pitching prospect since Bill Foster.  While with the American Giants, he earned the moniker "Rubber Arm" for his ability to extend his body for errant throws at first base.

Hudson died in Cincinnati, Ohio in 1943 at age 25.

References

External links
 and Seamheads

1918 births
1943 deaths
Cincinnati Tigers players
Kansas City Monarchs players
Chicago American Giants players